Santosh Kashyap is an Indian football manager and former player, who is the current head coach of Chennaiyin FC B. During his professional career, he represented India in international level and Mahindra United in the National Football League. Previously, he has been youth coach at Mahindra United, and Mohun Bagan.

Coaching career
After the end of his playing career, Kashyap went into coaching. His first job was as the Mahindra United U-19 coach. During his last season with the Mahindra Youth Team he guided them to the Super Division title in the Mumbai Football League.

Air India
Before the 2010-11 I-League season Santosh signed for I-League club Air India FC. Despite the low amount of funds that were given to Santosh he still managed to keep Air India out of the relegation zone.

Mohun Bagan

Kashyap was appointed Mohun Bagan coach on 26 May 2012. However, he resigned after only two matches in 2012–13 I-League and a poor performance in 2012 Federation Cup.

ONGC
After resigning from Mohun Bagan, he was appointed by ONGC F.C. for the rest of the season.

Rangdajied United
Kashyap managed Rangdajied United F.C. for 2013–14 I-League season. However, On 21 February 2014, he was sacked by the team after a disappointing start of the season.

Royal Wahingdoh
Kashyap was appointed the coach for newly promoted Royal Wahingdoh before the start of the 2014–15 I-League. Under his coaching, Royal Wahingdoh ended the season in third position. However, Royal Wahingdoh pulled out of I-League and Kashyap left the club.

NorthEast United
In June2015 Kashyap was appointed as the assistant coach of Indian Super League club NorthEast United FC. At the end of the season he left the club.

Salgaocar
Kashyap was appointed as Salgaocar head coach in 2015–16 season. Kashyap parted ways with the club on 27 April 2016 at the end of the season.

Mumbai
On 22 June 2016, Mumbai F.C. announced that Kashyap will take over as head coach for the 2016-17 season.

Aizawl 
Kashyap was appointed as the head coach by the defending champions, Aizawl F.C.

Personal life
His son Sameer Kashyap is also a footballer who plays as forward, and represented DSK Shivajians at the U16 level and Chennaiyin's reserve team in the I-League 2nd Division.

Statistics

Managerial statistics

Honours

Mahindra United
 Federation Cup runner-up: 1993

India
 South Asian Games Bronze medal: 1989

See also
 List of association football families

References

External links
News archive on Santosh Kashyap at Sportskeeda

1966 births
Living people
Footballers from Delhi
Indian footballers
India international footballers
Mahindra United FC players
Indian football managers
Air India FC managers
Mohun Bagan AC managers
Salgaocar FC managers
I-League managers
Association football forwards
Aizawl FC managers
Bengal Mumbai FC players
South Asian Games medalists in football
South Asian Games bronze medalists for India